Littletown could be the following places:
 Littletown, Arizona, USA
 Littletown, County Durham, England
 Littletown, County Kildare, a townland in County Kildare, Ireland
 Littletown, County Westmeath, a townland in Kilkenny West civil parish, barony of Kilkenny West, County Westmeath, Ireland
 Littletown, County Wexford, a townland in Tomhaggard civil parish, barony of Bargy, County Wexford, Ireland
 Littletown, Isle of Wight, England
 Littletown, New Jersey, USA
 Littletown, West Yorkshire, England

See also
Little Town (disambiguation)
Littleton (disambiguation)